The Bridges at Toko-Ri is a 1954 American war film about the Korean War and stars William Holden, Grace Kelly, Fredric March, Mickey Rooney, and  Robert Strauss. The film, which was directed by Mark Robson, was produced by Paramount Pictures. Dennis Weaver and Earl Holliman make early screen appearances in the film.

The screenplay is based on the 1953 novel The Bridges at Toko-ri by Pulitzer Prize winner James Michener. The story, which closely follows the novel, is about the U.S. Navy pilots assigned to bomb a group of heavily defended bridges in North Korea. It emphasizes the lives of the pilots and crew in the context of the Korean War; a conflict that seems remote to all except those who fight in Korea.

Plot
U.S. Navy Lieutenant Harry Brubaker is a Naval Reserve officer and Naval Aviator who was called back to active duty from his civilian profession as an attorney to fly F9F Panthers in the Korean War. Returning from a mission with battle damage, he is forced to ditch into the sea and is rescued by a Sikorsky HO3S-1 manned by Chief Petty Officer (NAP) Mike Forney and Airman (NAC) Nestor Gamidge.

Forney had often been in trouble for brawling and sporting a non-regulation green top hat and scarf while flying his helicopter as encouragement to downed pilots in the water. Back aboard his ship, the aircraft carrier USS Savo Island, Brubaker is called to the quarters of Rear Admiral Tarrant, the Carrier Task Force 77 commander, who has taken an interest in Brubaker because he reminds Tarrant of his son, a Navy Pilot killed in World War II. Brubaker complains about the unfairness of his recall when most actively flying/actively drilling Naval Reserve pilots weren't recalled (Brubaker hadn't been flying in the Reserve), America is not actually "at war", and most Americans have no involvement.  Tarrant advises that, "All through history, men have had to fight the wrong war in the wrong place, but that's the one they're stuck with."

The Savo Island returns to port in Japan, where Brubaker is given a three-day shore leave in Tokyo with his wife Nancy and their children. The reunion is interrupted when Gamidge comes to Brubaker asking his help in bailing Forney out of the brig after a brawl. Nancy expresses her bewilderment to Tarrant, who explains that Forney saved her husband from freezing to death when he had to ditch his jet at sea and warns her that when they return to Korea, Brubaker will have to attack the dangerous bridges at Toko-Ri. He advises her to face the reality that Harry might be killed, which neither his wife nor daughter-in-law did, and thus were crushed by despair. Late that night Nancy asks Brubaker about the bridges.

Back on a carrier off Korea, Brubaker flies as wingman for Commander Lee, the carrier air group commander known as "CAG" (from his position as Commander, Air Group in the carrier), on a dangerous reconnaissance to photograph the bridges. Lee briefs his pilots on the coming mission using the film he took and Brubaker loses his nerve. However, he cannot bring himself to quit the mission or write a final letter to Nancy. Forney crosses the captain of the Savo Island once too often, and then he is exiled to a helicopter scow. As he is leaving the ship, he notices Brubaker's distress, and relates a "cure" for bad nerves that has worked for him. Brubaker follows his advice and finds renewed strength within himself.

In the attack on the bridges, the antiaircraft fire is intense, but the jets destroy the bridges without a loss. Lee then leads them to attack a secondary target, where Brubaker's jet is hit. Leaking fuel and descending, he tries to return to the carrier, but he cannot and crash-lands on land. Forney and Gamidge attempt to pick him up, but communist troops shoot down the helicopter. Gamidge is killed, and Forney takes cover in a muddy ditch with Brubaker. They try to hold off the enemy with pistols and Forney's and Gamidge's M1 carbines until they can be rescued, but both are killed by the North Korean and Red Chinese soldiers. Tarrant, angered by the news of Brubaker's death, demands an explanation from Commander Lee of why he attacked the second target. Lee defends his actions, noting that Brubaker was his pilot too, and that despite his loss, the mission was a success. Tarrant, realizing that Lee is correct, rhetorically asks, "Where do we get such men?"

Cast

 William Holden as LT Harry Brubaker
 Grace Kelly as Nancy Brubaker
 Fredric March as RADM George Tarrant
 Mickey Rooney as CPO (NAP) Mike Forney
 Robert Strauss as "Beer Barrel"
 Charles McGraw as CDR Wayne Lee
 Keiko Awaji as Kimiko
 Earl Holliman as AMN (NAC) Nestor Gamidge
 Richard Shannon as Lieutenant Olds
 Dennis Weaver as Flight Intelligence Officer (uncredited)
 US Navy Commander Marshall Beebe as Pilot

Production

Writing
Michener based the character of Harry Brubaker on Lieutenant Donald S. Brubaker, who like his counterpart, was a 29-year-old Naval Reservist from Denver recalled to active duty aboard . The basis for Admiral Tarrant was Rear Admiral John Perry, the carrier division commander at the time; that of Lee was Commander Marshall U. Beebe, CAG aboard Essex in 1951 and technical advisor for the film; and Forney on Chief (NAP) Duane Thorin, himself a colorful enlisted pilot known for his trademark non-regulation green headgear.

The pilot's rescue attempt at the climax of the novel and film was a composite of a pair of unrelated rescue attempts on February 8, 1952, both in the area of Wonsan, North Korea, with the second one involving a propeller-driven Douglas AD-1 Skyraider from Valley Forge that had been shot down while bombing the railroad bridges at Samdong-ni. However, though the shot-down aviators in the second attempt were initially listed as missing in action, they survived their ordeal, and they were captured by North Korean soldiers.

In the attacks against the historical bridges, the McDonnell F2H Banshee  fighter-bombers (represented by Grumman F9F Panther) that are at the heart of the story did not bomb the bridges themselves, since they did not have the capability of carrying the heavy aerial bombs that were needed. Instead, they carried out the perilous mission of suppressing enemy anti-aircraft fire.

Development
Film rights were purchased by the team of George Seaton and William Perlberg, who had a production unit at Paramount. They wanted Spencer Tracy for the role of admiral, but this was played by Frederic March.

Filming

The aircraft used in the film is the Grumman F9F-2 Panther, a Korean War workhorse still in service and equipping the air groups of both carriers at the time the film was made. In the novel, however, Brubaker's squadron flew McDonnell F2H Banshees. The squadron depicted is an actual unit, Fighter Squadron 192 (VF-192) "Golden Dragons," which was aboard Oriskany during the filming, and from its part in the movie, thereafter, billed itself as the "World Famous Golden Dragons." VF-192 had two war deployments to Korea, but aboard  and flying Vought F4U-4 Corsairs. The movie also took advantage of the early uses of helicopters in the military. Rooney's character flies a S-51/HO3S-1/H-5F, G, H Sikorsky "DragonFly" which was well-known as a naval rescue aircraft.

Location filming was also done in Post-War Japan at the US Naval Base in Yokosuka, Kanagawa, and the historic Fujiya Hotel at Hakone. A ranch in Thousand Oaks, California, was also used for filming.

Release
Although the film was released in Canada in December, 1954, it opened in the rest of the world, including the U.S., in 1955.

Reception
The Bridges at Toko-Ri was well received by critics and public alike. As an example of the films that came out of the Korean War, it was considered more of a multi-faceted account that dealt with both ordinary seamen and command officers involved in combat. Typical of the reviews was one by Bosley Crowther of The New York Times, who noted how the film adaptation was true to the original story and was "vividly and movingly developed in this punctilious film." The close cooperation of the U.S. Navy led to spectacular aerial scenes as well as carrier action. A raid sequence with large scale models intercut with combat footage was a particularly effective scene that was later recognized in the Academy Awards.

Awards and honors
The Bridges at Toko-Ri won the Academy Award for Best Special Effects (1956) and Alma Macrorie was nominated for an Academy Award for Best Editing (1956). Mark Robson was also nominated for Outstanding Directorial Achievement in Motion Pictures in the Directors Guild of America Awards (1956).

The film is recognized by American Film Institute in these lists:
 2006: AFI's 100 Years...100 Cheers – Nominated

Anti-war Themes 
Atypical of the World War II movies produced by Hollywood, The Bridges at Toko-Ri was considered a quiet anti-war  themed movie. The Korean War never got the same attention in media as World War II as its geopolitical purpose in world security was considered dubious.  Brubaker's character questions the purpose of the Korean War with the Rear Admiral and others. The final scenes of the movie document the hopeless deaths of the main protagonists as they lay in a muddy ditch in a foreign land. As the movie progresses through dangerous missions(ditching, flak fly throughs), Brubaker experiences moments of panic and PTSD as the Bridge mission looms closer and closer. Grace Kelly's character being a metaphorical representation of the country's confusion over the Korean War but remaining dutiful and unquestioning in its purpose.

In Popular Culture
In a scene from the 2021 movie Licorice Pizza, Sean Penn plays an aging actor named "Jack Holden" who starred with Grace Kelly in a film called The Bridges of Toko-San. Despite the name changes, this scene is an obvious allusion to William Holden and The Bridges at Toko-Ri (as is Tom Waits' character, director "Rex Blau", an obvious allusion to Mark Robson, director of Toko-Ri, in the same scene).

References
Notes

Citations

Bibliography

 Dolan, Edward F. Jr. Hollywood Goes to War. London: Bison Books, 1985. .
 Evans, Alun. Brassey's Guide to War Films. Dulles, Virginia: Potomac Books, 2000. .
 Frietas, Gary A. War Movies: The Belle & Blade Guide to Classic War Videos. Bandon, Oregon: Robert D. Reed Publishers, 2011. .
 Harwick, Jack and Ed Schnepf. "A Viewer's Guide to Aviation Movies". The Making of the Great Aviation Films, General Aviation Series, Volume 2, 1989.
 Parish, James Robert. The Great Combat Pictures: Twentieth-Century Warfare on the Screen. Metuchen, New Jersey: The Scarecrow Press, 1990. .
 Provencher, Ken. "Bizarre Beauty: 1950s Runaway Production in Japan".  The Velvet Light Trap (Austin, Texas: University of Texas Press), Issue 73, Spring 2014, pp. 39–50. . (Subscription required.)
 Sears, David. "Chapter 12: Epics in failure." Such Men as These: The Story of the Navy Pilots Who Flew the Deadly Skies over Korea. Cambridge, Massachusetts: Da Capo Press, 2010. .
 Wise, James E. and Anne Collier Rehill. Stars in Blue: Movie Actors in America's Sea Services. Annapolis, Maryland: Naval Institute Press, 2007. .

External links

 
 
 
 

1955 films
1950s war drama films
American war drama films
1950s English-language films
Films about the United States Navy
Films about shot-down aviators
Films based on military novels
Films directed by Mark Robson
Films scored by Lyn Murray
Films that won the Best Visual Effects Academy Award
Korean War aviation films
Films based on American novels
Films based on works by James A. Michener
United States in the Korean War
Paramount Pictures films
1955 drama films
Films set on aircraft carriers
Films about the Korean People's Army
Films set in North Korea
Films set in Japan
Films produced by William Perlberg
Films produced by George Seaton
1950s American films